Khokok Roniarto (born on 19 March 1990) is an Indonesian professional footballer who plays as a defender for Liga 2 club PSCS Cilacap.

Club career

PSCS Cilacap
On 17 June 2022, it was announced that Khokok would be joining PSCS Cilacap for the 2022–23 Liga 2 campaign.

References

External links
 Khokok Roniarto at Soccerway
 Khokok Roniarto at Liga Indonesia

1989 births
Association football defenders
Living people
People from Tulungagung Regency
Indonesian footballers
Liga 1 (Indonesia) players
Indonesian Premier Division players
Persik Kediri players
Persekam Metro players
Persepam Madura Utama players
Sportspeople from East Java